BIFA Award may refer to:

British Independent Film Awards
 BIFA awards, given by the British International Freight Association